Syumsinsky District (Sjumsi joros) is an administrative and municipal district (raion), one of the twenty-five in the Udmurt Republic, Russia. It is located in the west of the republic. Its administrative center is the rural locality (a selo) of Syumsi. Population:  16,288 (2002 Census);  The population of Syumsi accounts for 39.7% of the district's total population.

References

Sources

Districts of Udmurtia